The Living and the Dead is a British six-episode supernatural horror television series created by Ashley Pharoah. The plot revolves around Nathan Appleby (played by Colin Morgan) and his wife, Charlotte Appleby (played by Charlotte Spencer), whose farm is believed to be at the centre of numerous supernatural occurrences.

Cast

Main cast
Colin Morgan as Nathan Appleby, a pioneering Victorian psychologist who moves to his family's estate in Somerset and encounters disturbing events
Charlotte Spencer as Charlotte Appleby, a pioneering photographer who accompanies her husband to try to turn the farm's fortunes around
Nicholas Woodeson as Reverend Matthew Denning

Supporting cast
 Isaac Andrews as Charlie Thatcher
 Elizabeth Berrington as Maud Hare
 Sarah Counsell Lizzie Merrifield
Robert Emms as Peter Hare
 Amber Fernée as Bathsheba Thatcher
 Joel Gillman as Jack Langtree
 Tallulah Haddon as Harriet Denning
 Kerrie Hayes as Gwen Pearce
Liam McMahon as Tinker
 David Oakes as William Payne
 Marianne Oldham as Mary Denning
 Harry Peacock as Smith
Chloe Pirrie as Lara
 Pooky Quesnel as Agnes Thatcher
 Malcolm Storry as Gideon Langtree
 Steve Oram as John Roebuck

Production

Development
The series was created by Life on Mars and Ashes to Ashes co-creator Ashley Pharoah. Pharoah's creative partner Matthew Graham was initially attached to the series, but withdrew prior to its production to work on Childhood's End for SyFy. The series is directed by Alice Troughton and Sam Donovan.

Casting
On 5 June 2015, Colin Morgan and Charlotte Spencer were announced to join the cast.

Filming
The Living and the Dead production was based in the Bottle Yard Studios in Bristol, England. The primary filming location was Horton Court in Gloucestershire.

The six-part BBC One TV Series began rehearsals on 29 July 2015, and shooting commenced in the West Country on 3 August 2015, with an official announcement about the series on 7 August 2015. Filming concluded on 18 December 2015.

On 12 August 2016, BBC had officially stated that the series would not be renewed for a second series.

Music
Bristol-based duo The Insects were commissioned to write the score for the series. The first episode features the traditional song "She Moved Through the Fair" sung by Elizabeth Fraser, plus the Anglican hymn "Immortal, Invisible, God Only Wise" at the ploughman's funeral. Another recurring song is "The Reaper's Ghost", composed by Richard Dyer-Bennet in 1935.

Episodes

Reception
Review aggregator website Rotten Tomatoes gave Series 1 an approval rating of 83%, with an average rating of 6.33 out of 10 based on 12 critics. The site's critical consensus is, "This throwback to classic gothic tales of yore is ideal viewing for audiences seeking a spooky sit without intense jolts and shocks."

References

External links
 

Scripts for Season 1
Interview with Ashley Pharoah by Montse Bru

2016 British television series debuts
2016 British television series endings
2010s British drama television series
2010s British mystery television series
Fiction set in 1894
Television series set in the 1890s
Television shows set in Somerset
English-language television shows
BBC Cymru Wales television shows
BBC television dramas
2010s British television miniseries
British horror fiction television series
Period television series
Occult detective fiction
Television series about ghosts
2010s British horror television series